Trachea is a genus of moths of the family Noctuidae erected by Ferdinand Ochsenheimer in 1816.

Species
 Trachea altivolans Schaus, 1911
 Trachea anguliplaga (Walker, 1858)
 Trachea atriplaga Hampson, 1911
 Trachea atriplicis (Linnaeus, 1758) – orache moth
 Trachea atritornea Hampson, 1908
 Trachea aurigera (Walker, 1858)
 Trachea auriplena (Walker, 1857)
 Trachea belastigma Hreblay & Ronkay, 1998
 Trachea bipectinata Berio, 1977
 Trachea brunneicosta Joicey & Talbot, 1915
 Trachea cavagnaroi Hayes, 1975
 Trachea chloodes Zerny, 1916
 Trachea chlorochrysa Berio, 1937
 Trachea confluens (Moore, 1881)
 Trachea conjuncta Wileman, 1914
 Trachea delicata (Grote, 1874)
 Trachea espumosa (Dognin, 1897)
 Trachea eugrapha E. D. Jones, 1908
 Trachea euryscia Hampson, 1918
 Trachea guttata (Warren, 1913)
 Trachea jankowskii (Oberthür, 1879)
 Trachea leuchochlora Boursin, 1970
 Trachea leucodonta Hampson, 1908
 Trachea luzonensis Wileman & South, 1920
 Trachea macropthtalma Berio, 1976
 Trachea malezieuxi (Dognin, 1897)
 Trachea mancilla (Schaus, 1921)
 Trachea melanospila Kollar, 1844
 Trachea microspila Hampson, 1908
 Trachea mnionia Dognin, 15
 Trachea nicgrescens Schaus, 1911
 Trachea normalis Hampson, 1914
 Trachea novicia Schaus, 1933
 Trachea oxylus (Fawcett, 1917)
 Trachea paranica Schaus, 1898
 Trachea polychroa Hampson, 1908
 Trachea prasinatra Draudt, 1950
 Trachea punctisigna Dognin, 1914
 Trachea punkikonis Matsumura, 1929
 Trachea stieglmayri Zerny, 1916
 Trachea stoliczkae (Felder & Rogenhofer, 1874)
 Trachea supera Schaus, 1911
 Trachea tessellata (Prout, 1925)
 Trachea tibetensis (Warren, 1912)
 Trachea tokiensis (Butler, 1881)
 Trachea toxaridia (Druce, 1889)
 Trachea uscana (Druce, 1889)
 Trachea viridata Prout, 1922
 Trachea viridis (Druce, 1898)
 Trachea viridisparsa Laporte, 1972

References
 
 

Hadeninae